Barefoot Truth was an American independent roots rock band from New England.   Barefoot Truth consisted of Will Evans (lead vocals, drums, acoustic guitar), Jay Driscoll (electric guitar, Weissenborn, acoustic guitar), Andy Wrba (upright bass, electric bass), Garrett Duffy (harmonica), and John "Wayno" Waynelovich (piano, organ). They performed at a pre-debate rally in New York for the Obama presidential campaign. In July 2012, the band announced on their website that they would be breaking up following a farewell tour in fall 2012. During the band's final show in Boston on November 11, 2012, this was changed to the band being on hiatus, rather than breaking up.

Over Memorial Day weekend of 2015, the band reunited to play a set as part of the Summer Sound Festival at Tanglewood in Lenox, Massachusetts. The set featured both Barefoot Truth songs and some of Will Evans' solo music. The continue to reunite every year or so or occasional studio and live work.

Discography
 2005: Changes in the Weather
 2006: Club House Sessions
 2007: Walk Softly
 2009: Wake the Mountain with Pete Francis
 2010: Life is Calling with Naia Kete
 2010: Threads
 2011: Live at Higher Ground
 2011: Carry Us On
 2014: Live From Boomtown
 2019: Live & Acoustic at Northfire

Band members
 Will Evans - lead vocals, drums, guitar
 Jay Driscoll - vocals, guitar, weissenborn, bass guitar
 Andy Wrba - double bass, bass guitar, guitar
 Garrett Duffy - harmonica, percussion
 Wayno - keyboards, vocals

References

External links
Barefoot Truth
 https://archive.today/20130209020208/http://wailingcity.com/feature-interview-with-barefoot-truth

American folk rock groups
Indie rock musical groups from Connecticut
Musical groups from Massachusetts
Jam bands
Mystic, Connecticut
Reggae rock groups